Arsenolite is an arsenic mineral, chemical formula As4O6. It is formed as an oxidation product of arsenic sulfides. Commonly found as small octahedra it is white,  but impurities of realgar or orpiment may give it a pink or yellow hue. It can be associated with its dimorph claudetite (a monoclinic form of As2O3) as well as realgar (As4S4), orpiment (As2S3) and erythrite, Co3(AsO4)2·8H2O.

Arsenolite belongs to the minerals which are highly toxic.

Occurrence
It was first described in 1854 for an occurrence in the St Andreasberg District, Harz Mountains, Lower Saxony, Germany.

It occurs by the oxidation of arsenic-bearing sulfides in hydrothermal veins. It also occurs as a result of mine or coal seam fires.

References 

Arsenic minerals
Cubic minerals
Minerals in space group 227
Minerals described in 1854